Pont-de-Montvert-Sud-Mont-Lozère is a commune in the department of Lozère, southern France. The municipality was established on 1 January 2016 by merger of the former communes of Le Pont-de-Montvert, Fraissinet-de-Lozère and Saint-Maurice-de-Ventalon.

References

See also 
Communes of the Lozère department

Communes of Lozère
Populated places established in 2016
2016 establishments in France